Petro Namuilyk (Ukrainian: Петро Петрович Намуйлик; born 13 March 1996) is a Ukrainian footballer.

References

1996 births
Living people
People from Varash
Ukrainian footballers
Association football midfielders
NK Zavrč players
FC Skala Stryi (2004) players
FC Podillya Khmelnytskyi players
Pärnu JK Vaprus players
Esiliiga players
Ukrainian First League players
Ukrainian expatriate footballers
Ukrainian expatriate sportspeople in Slovenia
Expatriate footballers in Slovenia
Ukrainian expatriate sportspeople in Estonia
Expatriate footballers in Estonia
Sportspeople from Rivne Oblast